Viðoy is the northernmost island in the Faroe Islands, located east of Borðoy to which it is linked via a causeway. The name means wood island, despite the fact that no trees grow on the island; the name relates to the driftwood that floats in from Siberia and North America.

Geography 
The island has two settlements: Hvannasund on the south-west coast and Viðareiði on the north-west coast, the northernmost settlement in the Faroes. A road along the west coast of the island connects the two. The island is connected by a road causeway from Hvannasund to Norðdepil on Borðoy, and a bus service from Klaksvík runs across the causeway to the island.

Important bird area
The island's northern and eastern coast has been identified as an Important Bird Area by BirdLife International because of its significance as a breeding site for seabirds, especially European storm petrels (500 pairs), black-legged kittiwakes (5300 pairs), Atlantic puffins (25,000 pairs), common guillemots (6700 individuals) and black guillemots (200 pairs).

Mountains

Viðoy has eleven mountains, of which Villingadalsfjall is the northernmost peak in the Faroes. The north coast also has the Enniberg cliff, which at 750 m is the second-highest sea-cliff in Europe (after Hornelen, in Norway). The mountains are shown with their overall rank in the Faroe Islands.

See also
List of mountains of the Faroe Islands

References

External links 
 
 
 Personal website with 6 aerial photos of Viðoy

Islands of the Faroe Islands
Important Bird Areas of the Faroe Islands